The Song of Life is a 1926 German silent film directed by Arthur Bergen and starring Carl de Vogt, Erna Moreno and Angelo Ferrari.

The art direction was by Ludwig Reiber. It was made at the Emelka Studios in Munich.

Cast
In alphabetical order

References

Bibliography

External links

1926 films
Films of the Weimar Republic
Films directed by Arthur Bergen
German silent feature films
Bavaria Film films
Films shot at Bavaria Studios
German black-and-white films